Flou is a Paraguayan rock band. It may also refer to:

 "Flou" (song), a 2019 single by Angèle
 Flou, a 1978 album by Pavlos Sidiropoulos
 Flou, a furniture maker founded in 1978 by Rosario Messina

See also

 Phlou language

 Flo (disambiguation)
 Floe (disambiguation)
 Floh (disambiguation)
 Flow (disambiguation)